Dear Cyborgs is a 2017 novel with elements of speculative fiction by American writer Eugene Lim. Lim wrote two other novels before Dear Cyborgs. Critics gave the novel mostly positive reviews.

Development
Lim wrote the novel before the 2016 presidential election. He nevertheless wrote it in "a state of despair" due to climate change and economic inequality, which he refers to as two “slow apocalypses”.

Lim has said that he believes "...superheroes are the central mythology of our collective global era" on their inclusion in the novel.

Influences
A number of works influenced Lim during while writing Dear Cyborgs. Tan Lin's Insomnia and the Aunt and Yongsoo Park's Boy Genius both influenced the novel's plot as existing works that subvert tropes in Asian American assimilation plots. Robert Creeley’s The Island and Eileen Myles’ Inferno—both "poet's novels"—influenced Lim's authorial presence.

Setting
The novel alternates between several settings, including a "white-bread suburban" town in Ohio during the 1980s, and New York City circa 2011, during a fictionalized version of Occupy Wall Street. Lim grew up in small-town Ohio, and later moved to New York.

Publication history
FSG Originals, an imprint of Farrar, Straus and Giroux, published the novel in 2017.

References

2017 American novels
American speculative fiction novels
Novels set in New York City
Novels set in Ohio
Superhero novels
Farrar, Straus and Giroux books